Global Underground 005: Tony De Vit, Tokyo is a DJ mix album in the Global Underground series, compiled and mixed by Tony De Vit. It was released after his death which occurred on 2 July 1998.

The set was taken from a gig Tony played at in Liquid Rooms, Tokyo, Japan.

At the time of its release Tony de Vit had progressed from his Sunday morning sets at Trade to a global stage. He was a resident at Cream in both Liverpool and Ibiza, had a show on London’s Kiss 100FM and a stream of distinctive tracks and remixes out.

The sound he had championed had made the leap from the underground into big Saturday night main rooms and Tony’s name on a flyer ensured a guaranteed roadblock. But pre-digital downloads, the music was still relatively unknown in Japan, so when GU rolled into town for an unsuspecting Liquid Rooms crowd in Tokyo, the reaction provided one of the most memorable of all GUs foreign adventures.

This mix stays true to the spirit of that gig. It also serves as a suitably fine tribute to the DJ behind it.

Disc one 
Dave Randall - Bombay – 7:08
Chris C - Whitewolf – 4:12
DEX - Groundswell – 5:36
The Freak & Mac Zimms - Make A Move – 4:39
KGB - Cagey Groove – 6:17
DJ Oberon - Brainwave – 5:04
Barr & Winchester - Chekin The Cuts – 5:15
Funkhole - Tryptic – 5:58
Montreal Sound - Sure Of You – 5:15
KGB - Scorchio – 6:25
Shakira - Let Your Mind Get Free – 5:41
Tony De Vit - Feel My Love – 6:47
Knuckleheadz - Turn That Fucking Music Up – 4:45

Disc two 
Knuckleheadz - Turn That Fucking Music Up – 3:20
Joy Foundation - Work It – 5:18
UK Gold -  Nuclear Shower – 5:54
Point 2 - Wait 1 Minute – 5:11
Dyewitness - What Would You Like to Hear – 4:50
Mark N-R-G - Don't Stop (Baby Doc Mix) – 5:10
Marmion - Schöneberg (Tony De Vit Mix) – 7:45
Tony De Vit - Get Loose – 4:58
The Source - Clouds (Jon The Dentist Mix) – 4:58
Chupher - Systems Pumping – 5:11
UK Gold -  Nuclear Shower (UK Gold Mix) – 4:31
Nuclear Hyde - Accelerator – 4:57
Incisions - Beyond Motion – 6:25
DJ Randy - Fusion – 7:10

References

External links 

Global Underground
1998 compilation albums
DJ mix albums